Breaking Bonaduce is an American reality television series that aired on VH1, focusing on former child-actor Danny Bonaduce, and how his (then-) increasingly unstable lifestyle impacted his then-wife, Gretchen, and their two children. The series premiered in September 2005 and ended in December 2006.

Overview
The series focused on the problems and events that had led Bonaduce, speaking retrospectively, to consider his life a "car crash". Over the course of filming, Bonaduce's previously publicized abuse of drugs resumes; an initially successful effort to replace that unhealthy behavior with overzealous exercise/bodybuilding backfires (as he falls into experimenting with performance-enhancing drugs, in order to "chase" the endorphin "rush" that overexercising gives him); and, later attempts suicide. He also makes periodic attempts to save his crumbling marriage by attending couple's counseling with his wife, Gretchen (who, over the course of the series, evolves from being Danny's constant enabler/excuse-maker, to filing for divorce after Bonaduce's dangerous antics finally push her too far).

In the United Kingdom, the series is known as My Reality TV Breakdown. Throughout Latin America, it is known as Destrozando a Bonaduce which translates as Destroying Bonaduce.

This show was produced by 3Ball Productions, and directed by Mark Jacobs.

Critical response
The series was both celebrated and criticized for making voyeuristic entertainment of a seemingly "no limits"-style documentation of Bonaduce's mounting—and generally self-inflicted—misfortunes. A review in Variety magazine said, "...It's hard to imagine a shower long enough to wash away the experience of simply viewing the show, much less having produced, programmed or participated in it."

Episodes

Season 1

Season 2

References

External links
 
 

2005 American television series debuts
2006 American television series endings
2000s American reality television series
English-language television shows
VH1 original programming